Rạch Gốc is an urban municipality and town in the Ngọc Hiển District of Cà Mau Province, Vietnam, approximately 68 kilometres from Cà Mau city. It covers an area of 5,271.5 hectares and as of 2004 had a population of 7,831. It lies near the South China Sea near the southernmost tip of Vietnam.

Communes of Cà Mau province
Populated places in Cà Mau province
District capitals in Vietnam
Townships in Vietnam